Alice Patten is an English actress, and the daughter of Chris Patten, Baron Patten of Barnes, a prominent British Conservative politician and the last Governor of Hong Kong. She has played a key role in the Bollywood film Rang De Basanti (2006). Her role earned her praise from film critics in India. She lived in Hong Kong from 1992 to 1997.

Early life
Patten was educated at Island School in Hong Kong
and at Queens' College, Cambridge.

Career
Her first major role after graduation was Eugenie in Vincent in Brixton in the West End in 2002.

In 2004, she appeared in Jonathan Creek as Gillian Bailey.

In 2005 and 2006, she appeared in English Touring Theatre's Hamlet, playing Ophelia opposite Ed Stoppard's Prince of Denmark.

In 2006, she appeared in the Bollywood film Rang De Basanti as Sue McKinley, a young British woman who comes to India to make a documentary film about the British rule in the Indian subcontinent. In 2008, she played Thea in Hedda, a new version of Ibsen's Hedda Gabler, at London's Gate Theatre and, in 2009, she guest-starred as Arthur's mother Ygraine in the BBC fantasy drama series Merlin.

Patten also played the role of Vicky Anderson, in an episode of New Tricks, the daughter of an English-born Hong Kong businessman, Douglas Anderson, who had been involved in questionable building deals in Hong Kong, shortly before the end of British rule in 1997.

Filmography

Television 
 The Forsyte Saga (2002) as Imogen. 2 episodes
 Where the Heart Is (2003) as Candida Oliver-Watts. 3 episodes
 The Last King (2003) as Lady Farnces Stewart. 1 episode
 Jonathan Creek (2004) as Dawn/Gillian Bailey. 1 episode
 Midsomer Murders (2004) as Emily Hide. 1 episode
 Heroes and Villains (2008) as Joan. 1 episode
 Mistresses (2010) as Alice. 4 episodes
 New Tricks (2010) as Vicky Anderson. 1 episode
 Merlin (2009–2010) as Ygraine. 3 episodes
 The Musketeers (2014) as Sister Hélène. 1 episode
 Our Girl (2014) as Rebecca. 1 episode
 Downtown Abbey (2014) as Diana Clark. 1 episode
 Six Wives with Lucy Worsley (2016) as Katherine Parr. 1 episode

Film 
 Vincent In Brixton (2003) as Eugenie Loyer
 Rang De Basanti (2006) as Sue McKinley. Indian film
 Trade Routes (2008) as Sarah
The Dry Cleaner (2019) as Control

References

External links
 
 Alice Patten interview on Rang De Basanti in BBC

Year of birth missing (living people)
Living people
Actresses from London
People educated at Island School
Alumni of Queens' College, Cambridge
Daughters of life peers
English television actresses
English film actresses
English stage actresses
British expatriates in Hong Kong
English expatriates in India
Actresses in Hindi cinema
British expatriate actresses in India
European actresses in India
Actresses of European descent in Indian films
21st-century English actresses